The Central University of Chile (UCEN) is the first autonomous private university in Chile, founded in 1982 in Santiago de Chile. It's accredited in the areas of institutional management and undergraduate teaching by the National Accreditation Commission of Chile for a term of four years from December 2017 to December 2021.

The Central University of Chile is structured in five faculties in which are held 33 undergraduate programs and a Intitute that imparts 6 top-level technical careers. Also Central University has PhD., masters and various training programs and continuing education in the areas of Management, Business, Government, Architecture, Social Sciences, Law, Education, Health and Technology.

The Headquarters of Central University of Chile is located in the University District of Santiago, near the Toesca metro station, addition to four campuses, an extension center and a sports center in the heart of the capital, totaling more than 89,000 m2 infraestructura. Also has one campus in the city of La Serena, Región de Coquimbo in the north of Chile.

Rectors

Faculties 

 Faculty of Engineering and Architecture
School of Engineering
School of Architecture and Landscape
  Faculty of Economy, Government and Communications
 School of Economics and Business
 School of Government and Communications
 Faculty of Education and Social Science
 School of Initial Education
 School of Secondary Education and Social Sciences
 Faculty of Law and Humanities
 School of Law and Social Work
 Faculty of Healthcare science
 School of Health
 School of Psychology and Occupational Therapy
 Institute of Technical Careers

Notable alumni
 Felipe Harboe. Senator for Senate cirucunscripcion No. 12 (Bio Bio Cordillera).
 Romy Schmidt. Former Minister of National Assets.

International agreements

America

  Argentina
 Universidad de Buenos Aires
 Universidad Nacional de San Juan
  Bolivia
 Fundación Universidad Privada de Santa Cruz de la Sierra UPSA
 Universidad Central
  Brazil
 Centro Universitario LA SALLE UNILASALLE
 Centro Universitario Salesiano de Sao Paulo (UNISAL)
 International Faculty of Curitiba
 Faculdade América Latina
 Faculdade da Serra Gaúcha FSG
 Faculdade de Medicina do ABC
 Centro Universitário Internacional - UNINTER
 Pontificia Universidad Católica de Campinas
 Universidade Católica de Goiás
 Universidade de Brasília
 Universidade de Santa Cruz do Sul – UNISC
 Universidade do Vale do Rio dos Sinos (UNISINOS)
  Colombia
 Corporación Universitaria U de Colombia
 Pontificia Universidad Javeriana
 Universidad Antonio Nariño
 Universidad Central
 Universidad de Boyacá
 Universidad de San Buenaventura Seccional Cali
 Universidad de Sucre
 Universidad del Atlántico
 Universidad del Rosario
 Universidad EAFIT
 Universidad ICESI
 Universidad Militar Nueva Granada
 Universidad Piloto de Colombia
 Universidad Pontificia Bolivariana
 Universidad Pontificia Bolivariana Montería
 Universidad Santo Tomás
 Universidad Tecnológico de Antioquia
 Universidad de Investigación y Desarrollo
 Universidad EAN
 Universidad de La Salle
  Costa Rica
 Tecnológico de Costa Rica
 Universidad Santa Paula
  Cuba
 Universidad de La Habana
  Ecuador
 Escuela Superior Politécnica del Litoral
 Universidad Central
  United States
 Kansas State University
  Mexico
The College of Mexico
 Instituto Politécnico Nacional
Instituto Superior de Arquitectura y Diseño – ISAD
 Instituto Tecnológico y de Estudios Superiores de Monterrey – ITESM
 Universidad Autónoma de Nuevo León
 Universidad Autónoma de Sinaloa
 Universidad de Oriente – Puebla
 Universidad LUX
 Universidad Nacional Autónoma de México – UNAM
 Universidad Pedagógica Nacional
 Universidad Tecnológica de Puebla
 Universidad Tecmilenio
 Universidad de Sonora
  Parama
Universidad de Panamá
Universidad Especializada de Las Américas
  Peru
Universidad Científica del Sur
Universidad Continental
Universidad de Lima
Universidad Nacional del Altiplano
Universidad Nacional Mayor de San Marcos
Universidad Privada de Tacna
  Uruguay
Universidad de La República

Asia

  China
 Changzhou University
 Zhejiang International Studies University
  Korea
 Universidad Católica de Daegu
 University of Seoul
 Hankuk University of Foreign Studies – HUFS
 Kyung Hee University, Graduate School of Pan-Pacific International Studies and College of International Studies

Europe

  Croacia
 University of Zágreb
  France
 École Nationale Supérieure d'Architecture et de Paysage de Bordeaux
 Institut Supérieur de Gestion – ISG
 Université Catholique de Lyon
  Germany
 Technische Hochschule Mittelhessen University of Applied Sciences
  Italy
 Università degli studi di Pavia
 Politecnico di Milano
 Università degli Studi di Roma "Tor Vergata"
  Netherlands
 Universiteit Leiden
  Romani
 Scola Nationala de Studii Politice si Administrative – SNSPA
  Spain
 Centro de Estudios Superiores la Salle
 Real Centro Universitario Escorial María Cristina
 Universidad Autónoma de Madrid
 Universidad de Alcalá
 Universidad de Castilla – La Mancha
 Universidad de Granada
 Universitat Juame I
 Universidad de La Rioja
 Universidad de Las Palmas de Gran Canaria
 Universidad de Málaga
 Universidad de Oviedo
 Universidad de Sevilla
 Universidad Politécnica de Madrid
 Universitas Miguel Hernández
 Universitat de les Illes Balears
 Universitat de València
 Universitat Politècnica de València
 Universitat Rovira i Virgili
 Universidad Santiago de Compostela
 Universidad de Vic – Universidad Central de Cataluña (Campus Manresa)
  Sweden
 Uppsala University

Campus

Student Federation 
The Central University of Chile Students Federation (Federación de Estudiantes de la Universidad Central de Chile [abbr. FEUCEN]) is an organization that represents all the students of the University with the academic authorities and the CONFECH (Confederation of Chilean Students). The current president of the FEUCEN is Marco Velarde a student from the School of Sociology.

References

External links
 Web page
 Facebook page
 Twitter Account

 
Universities in Chile
Educational institutions established in 1982
Universities in Santiago Metropolitan Region
1982 establishments in Chile